The 1944 Governor General's Awards for Literary Merit were the ninth rendition of the Governor General's Awards, Canada's annual national awards program which then comprised literary awards alone. The awards recognized Canadian writers for new English-language works published in Canada during 1944 and were presented in 1945. There were no cash prizes.

As every year from 1942 to 1948, there two awards for non-fiction, and four awards in the three established categories, which recognized English-language works only.

Winners

 Fiction:  Gwethalyn Graham, Earth and High Heaven
 Poetry or drama: Dorothy Livesay, Day and Night
 Non-fiction: Dorothy Duncan, Partner in Three Worlds
 Non-fiction: Edgar McInnis, The War: Fourth Year

References

External links
 
 

Governor General's Awards
Governor General's Awards
1944 literary awards